Adrien-Marie Legendre (1752–1833) is the eponym of all of the things listed below.

26950 Legendre
Associated Legendre polynomials
Fourier–Legendre series
Gauss–Legendre algorithm
Gauss–Legendre method
Gauss–Legendre quadrature
Legendre (crater)
Legendre chi function
Legendre duplication formula
Legendre–Papoulis filter
Legendre form
Legendre function
Legendre moment
Legendre polynomials
Legendre pseudospectral method
Legendre rational functions
Legendre relation
Legendre sieve
Legendre symbol
Legendre transformation
Legendre transform (integral transform)
Finite Legendre transform
Legendre wavelet
Legendre–Clebsch condition
Legendre–Fenchel transformation
Legendre's conjecture
Legendre's constant
Legendre's differential equation
Legendre's equation
Legendre's formula
Legendrian knot
Legendrian submanifold
Saccheri–Legendre theorem
Legendre's theorem on spherical triangles
Legendre's three-square theorem
Gamma function–Legendre formula

Legendre, Adrien-Marie